Year 1236 (MCCXXXVI) was a leap year starting on Tuesday (link will display the full calendar) of the Julian calendar.

Events 
 By place 

 Byzantine Empire 
 Spring – A fleet consisting of ships from the republics of Venice, Genoa and Pisa arrive at Constantinople. It is headed by Geoffrey II of Villehardouin, ruler of Achaea, who brings 100 of his own knights, 300 cross-bowman, and 500 archers. Geoffrey, formally a vassal of Emperor John I of Constantinople, breaks the blockade of the city, sinks 15 Byzantine ships and enters the Golden Horn. A treaty is signed for two years after the intervention of Angelo Sanudo, duke of Archipelago. 

 Europe 
 June 20 – Treaty of Kremmen: Duke Wartislaw III recognizes the seignory of Henry Borwin III, lord of Rostock, after his successful expedition against Wartislaw, in which he has conquered Circipania, including the cities of Gnoien and Kalen. Meanwhile, Duke Swietopelk II (the Great) conquers Schlawe and Stolp, the eastern part of Pomerania. To ease the tensions with Brandenburg, Wartislaw signs the Kremmen agreement.
 June – The 16-year-old Alexander Nevsky is elected by the Novgorodians as prince (knyaz) of Novgorod, beseeching the young Kievan noble to take charge of the city's military affairs.
 June 29 – Siege of Córdoba: Castilian forces under King Ferdinand III (the Saint) capture Muslim Córdoba from Emir Ibn Hud, as part of the Reconquista of the Iberian Peninsula.
 July – At a diet (princely convention) in Piacenza, Emperor Frederick II proclaims his wish to recover all Italy for the Holy Roman Empire.
 September 22 – Battle of Saule: The Lithuanians and Semigallians defeat the Livonian Brothers of the Sword, at Šiauliai in Lithuania.

 England 
 January 14 – King Henry III marries the 14-year-old Eleanor of Provence, one of the four daughters of Raimond Berenguer, count of Provence. The ceremony takes place at Canterbury Cathedral, while Simon de Montfort, as Lord High Steward, takes care of the banquet and kitchen arrangements. Eleanor is crowned queen at Westminster Abbey shortly afterward.
 A tournament at Tickhill turns into a battle between northerners and southerners, but peace is restored by papal legate Otto of Tonengo.

 Mongol Empire  
 The Mongols under Batu Khan, eldest of Jochi, sweep across Central Asia. They settle in the Russian steppe, curtailing the power of the Kievan Rus', extracting tribute from their neighbors, and disrupting their relationship with the Byzantine Empire.
 Autumn – Siege of Bilär: The Mongols under Batu Khan capture the capital city of Bilär after a siege that lasts for 45 days. The Volga Bulgars are defeated within the year, as are the Kipchaks and Alans.
 Mongol–Song War: The Mongols under Ögedei Khan penetrate deep into the Southern Song. The important city of Xiangyang, gateway to the Yangtze plain, capitulates to the Mongols. 

 Asia 
 October 10 – Razia Sultana, daughter of Mamluk Sultan Shamsuddin Iltutmish, becomes the first female Muslim ruler of the Indian subcontinent, deposing her half-brother, Ruknuddin Firuz, as sultan of the Delhi Sultanate.
 King Kalinga Magha (the Tyrant) is expelled from Polonnaruwa to Jaffna, capital of the Jaffna Kingdom (located in modern Sri Lanka). 

 Africa 
 Kouroukan Fouga, the constitution of the Mali Empire, is created by an assembly of nobles of the Mandinka clan.

 By topic 

 Literature 
 The Goryeo court in Korea orders the preparation of another set of woodblocks for printing the Buddhist Tripiṭaka (Triple Basket) – which is intended both to gain protection against the Mongol invaders and to replace the earlier 11th century set that has been destroyed by the Mongols (see 1232).
 
 Religion 
 Pope Gregory IX condemned the links that both the Knights Templer and Knights Hospitaller have with the Assassin fighters in the Middle East. He issues a bull, a formal proclamation issued by the pope, preventing further contact with the Assassins.
 May 6 – Roger of Wendover, English Benedictine monk and chronicler, dies at St. Albans Abbey. His chronicle is continued by Matthew of Paris.

Births 
 January 1 – Baldwin de Redvers, English nobleman (d. 1262)
 June 6 – Wen Tianxiang, Chinese poet and politician (d. 1283)
 June 8 – Violant of Aragon, queen consort of Castile (d. 1301)
 November 8 – Lu Xiufu, Chinese general and politician (d. 1279)
 Albert I (the Great), German nobleman and regent (d. 1279)
 Alice de Lusignan (or Angoulême), English countess (d. 1290)
 Bayan of the Baarin (or Boyan), Mongol general (d. 1295)
 Elizabeth of Hungary, duchess consort of Bavaria (d. 1271)
 Henry II of Rodez, French nobleman and troubadour (d. 1304) 
 Olivier II de Clisson, Breton nobleman and knight (d. 1307)
 Qutb al-Din al-Shirazi, Persian polymath and poet (d. 1311)
 Stephen the Posthumous, Hungarian pretender (d. 1271)

Deaths 
 January 14 – Sava (the Enlightener), Serbian archbishop
 March 15 – Mu'in al-Din Chishti, Persian preacher (b. 1143)
 March 28 – Conon of Naso, Italian priest and abbot (b. 1139)
 April 11 – Walter II de Beauchamp, English sheriff (b. 1192)
 May 1 – William d'Aubigny (or d'Albini), English nobleman
 May 6 – Roger of Wendover, English monk and chronicler
 May 7 – Agnellus of Pisa, Italian Franciscan friar (b. 1195)
 June 10 – Diana degli Andalò, Italian nun and saint (b. 1201)
 July 18 – Valdemar of Denmark, Danish statesman (b. 1158)
 July 29 – Ingeborg of Denmark, queen of France (b. 1174)
 August 16 – Thomas Blunville, English priest and bishop
 August 17 – William de Blois, English bishop and sheriff
 September 12 – Thomas of Marlborough, English abbot
 September 22 – Volkwin von Naumburg, German knight
 November 15 – Lope Díaz II, Castilian nobleman (b. 1170)
 November 26 – Al-Aziz Muhammad, Ayyubid ruler (b. 1213)
 Barisone III of Torres, Sardinian judge of Logudoro (b. 1221)
 Dirk I van Brederode, Dutch nobleman and knight (b. 1180)
 Fakhr-i Mudabbir, Ghaznavid historian and writer (b. 1157)
 Gautier de Coincy, French abbot and troubadour (b. 1177)
 John of Ibelin, constable and regent of Jerusalem (b. 1179)
 Philip d'Aubigny, French nobleman and chancellor (b. 1166)
 Saifuddin Aibak, Mamluk Sultanate governor and politician

References